A by-election was held for the Victorian Legislative Assembly seat of Rodney on 4 March 1989. The by-election was triggered by the resignation on 25 January of sitting National Party MP Eddie Hann.

Results

References

1989 elections in Australia
Victorian state by-elections
1980s in Victoria (Australia)